The Oilfields Workers' Trade Union or OWTU is one of the most powerful trade unions in Trinidad and Tobago.  Currently led by Ancel Roget, the union was born out of the 1937 labour riots, the union was nominally led by the imprisoned TUB Butler but was actually organised by lawyer Adrian Cola Rienzi. The union was established on July 25, 1937, and formally registered on September 15. The first meetings were held in Fyzabad, and the first official headquarters were established on Coffee Street, San Fernando.

In the 1960s and 1970s, under the leadership of George Weekes, the union grew into a potent political force, playing a role in the Black Power movement in 1970 and playing a role in the foundation of the United Labour Front. The Oilfields Workers' Trade Union (OWTU), widely recognized as the strongest and most militant trade union in Trinidad and Tobago and the Anglophone Caribbean, was born out of the General Strike that started on June 19, 1937, in the oilfields of south Trinidad. This was the most powerful of the mass actions that were taking place across the Caribbean, as the working class throughout the region were taking a stand and making their voices heard as they struggled against the poor working conditions which they were experiencing. At the same time the vast majority of workers faced social conditions such as very poor housing, inadequate health care, the lack of educational opportunities and racial discrimination, among other ills.

From the mid-1930s workers began to express their discontent through increasingly militant actions. Unemployment was high and wages which were low were reduced even as the employer class sought to ensure that they lost little in the face of the global economic crisis precipitated by the Wall Street Crash of 1929 and the Great Depression that followed. In addition to the many issues related to the poor working and social conditions which prevailed, these struggles also had a very important political dimension. The workers were also struggling against colonialism as evidenced by their call for "Home Rule". They knew that achieving independence would be a means to improving the conditions that they were then facing.

In this period of heightened mobilization against these injustices a leader emerged – Tubal Uriah "Buzz" Butler. Under his leadership the strike began on June 19, 1937 – the day Trinidad and Tobago commemorates today as Labour Day. The strike soon spread throughout Trinidad and involved all major sectors of workers (dockworkers, sugar workers, cocoa estate workers, railway workers and store workers) in the island. The uprising lasted until July 2, and the colonial authorities required the intervention of British troops from two battleships the Exeter and the Ajax to quell the protests. During this strike, 14 people died, including that of policeman, Charlie King, hundreds were injured and many persons were arrested.

It was out of these dynamic and historic circumstances that the OWTU was born. The first official meeting of the Union was held on July 15, 1937, at Mr. Williams quarters, Coon Town, Forest Reserve, Fyzabad. The first officers elected to office were Caleb Roach, chairman, McDonald Moses, Vice President, E. R. Blades, Secretary and E. Bennet, Treasurer. The OWTU was formally established just days later on July 25, 1937, at its Founding Conference, held at Saltfish Hall, Mucurapo Street in San Fernando. The Union was registered on September 15, 1937.

With Butler having to go into hiding after June 19 due to a warrant for his arrest on sedition and treason charges, a leader emerged – Adrian Cola Rienzi - who became the Union's first President General. Rienzi also became the first President of the All Trinidad Sugar Estates and Factory Workers' Trade Union (ATSEFWTU). At the same time McDonald Moses was made Vice President of both the OWTU and the ATSEFWTU unions. The OWTU's first Central Office established at 16 Coffee Street in San Fernando was also shared by the ATSEFWTU. The Blue Shirt uniform for which the OWTU is well known has been worn since the 1930s.

See also

References

External links
 OWTU Website

Trade unions in Trinidad and Tobago
International Federation of Chemical, Energy, Mine and General Workers' Unions
Mining trade unions